Reaper is the name of three characters in the DC Comics universe.

Publication history
The Pre-Crisis Reaper debuted in Batman #237 (Dec. 1971) and was created by Denny O'Neil. The character was inspired by science-fiction writer Harlan Ellison suggesting to O'Neill that he writes a story about Nazi war criminals.

Created by writer Mike W. Barr, and designed by artist Alan Davis, the Judson Caspian version of the Reaper first appeared in Detective Comics #575 (June 1987), the first part of the four-part Batman: Year Two storyline. After the changes in DC continuity that Zero Hour established, Year Two, Joe Chill's death and the Reaper have been wiped out. Chill was back in continuity after 2005's Infinite Crisis. A character dressed as the Reaper has appeared in The New 52, a 2011 reboot of the DC Comics universe, but it has not yet been revealed which (if any) of the previous Reapers is in the costume.

Fictional character biographies

Dr. Benjamin Gruener
Dr. Benjamin Gruener is a German Jew who was placed in a concentration camp run by Colonel Kurt Schloss. He kills Schloss at a Halloween parade and seemingly dies battling Batman when he falls off the edge of a dam.

In Tony S. Daniel's "Batman: Life After Death" story arc, the Reaper is resurrected by Hugo Strange who is working with Black Mask to take down Batman. He is seen in an underground chamber in a glass tub, while Strange instructs his doctors on bringing him back to life. When he regains consciousnesses, Black Mask reminds Gruener of his childhood in a concentration camp in hopes of fueling him with anger and revenge. Black Mask hands him a necklace with the Star of David on it that was given to him by his father, and then his scythe, the weapon he chose when first taking up the alias of the Reaper.

The Reaper is seen briefly in scenes and it is understood that he is murdering people because he wishes to bring justice to the "children of Gotham". He is fueled by his hatred toward Colonel Kurt Schloss, the Nazi who killed his parents.

The Reaper is then seen at Gotham Harbor demanding Strange give him a serum that is later found to keep his skin from deteriorating. The serum is injected into him by Doctor Death. He soon attacks Mario Falcone and the Huntress comes to Mario's defense to prevent the Reaper from killing him. Batman sweeps in to take out the Reaper but, instead, he escapes by throwing gas at Batman. Batman later finds him and when he sees that the Reaper's face is rotting, he asks Batman what they have done to him; Batman explains that he is only a pawn: "You weren't built to last, just to follow orders. The gentlemen behind you might want to explain themselves", referring to Strange, who had appeared behind him. With that, Batman leaves.

Judson Caspian

Judson Caspian is a socialite by day and a vigilante by night. After losing his wife to a robber in the streets, he becomes the Reaper who prowls Gotham City during the 1950s, targeting public menaces and murdering them with a scythe. He has a run-in with Green Lantern Alan Scott and disappears for a couple of decades.

After Caspian returns from Europe he renews his rampage as the Reaper, which brings him into conflict with Batman. Barely escaping with his life, Batman turns to the mob and finds himself working with their button man Joe Chill, the man who killed his parents. Having been assigned by the Gotham mob to kill both the Reaper and Batman when he had finished, Chill hunts the Reaper alongside Batman, the two briefly assuming that the Reaper has been killed in an explosion. After revealing his identity to Chill in a confrontation in Crime Alley and putting a gun to his head, Batman's revenge is taken from him by the Reaper, who shoots Chill in the head. Batman tracks the Reaper to a construction site, they fight, Batman gains the upper hand with Reaper hanging off a ledge. Batman finally unmasks him. Batman, who had intended to marry Caspian's daughter, Rachel, is shocked, and holds out his hand to help the Reaper. However, Caspian, who knows what charges he is up against, tells Batman that he will make a fine successor, and lets go of the ledge, plummeting to his death. After being exposed as the Reaper, Caspian is given a funeral funded by Bruce Wayne, who says that he deserves to rest in peace. Rachel, who was initially unaware of her father's crimes, becomes a nun after Caspian's life as the Reaper is exposed.

Joe Chill Jr.

In the 1991 one-shot sequel, Batman: Full Circle, Chill's son Joe Jr. briefly assumes the mantle of Reaper, as part of a plan to drive Batman insane.

Joseph Chilton III aka Joe Chill Jr. was introduced in collaboration with his sister Marcia, attempts to lure Batman into a confrontation, where they would finally dispose of the Dark Knight with a very different kind of weapon. Chill's schemes are hampered by the arrival of his own son, Joey, with whom Chill attempts to bond. It is revealed that Chill witnessed his father's death at the original Reaper's hands, though he could not make out Bruce Wayne's unmasked face. Overcome with grief, Chill seeks revenge on Batman by taking up the mantle of the Reaper. At the same time, Batman faces some personal issues with Rachel Caspian, who has returned to Gotham convinced the Reaper is her father reborn. Chill and his sister use this to their advantage, plaguing Rachel with a series of encounters which create doubt in her and Batman's minds that he is the returned Judson Caspian (it is also revealed in this story that Joe Chill Sr.'s body was stolen before it could be taken into custody at the end of Year Two). The Reaper uses an explosive to destroy the cornerstone of the Wayne Foundation building, freeing his father's old gun, which was used to murder Batman's parents.

Batman is eventually captured by Chill, who unmasks the unconscious crimefighter, but does not recognize him (Batman had applied extensive make-up to hide his identity). Chill subjects Batman to a video reel showing a child witnessing his parents' death and showing glee at the fact that he was not killed, which, combined with a hallucinogenic drug, is intended to reduce Batman to a quivering wreck suffering from survivor's guilt. Chill has Batman posed at the top of a tall pedestal overlooking a pool of acid, and hopes Batman will kill himself. Marcia, who sees her father as nothing more than a thug who abused her mother, attempts to double-cross her brother in order to deliver Batman to mob boss Morgan Jones. Chill slashes Marcia, apparently killing her. Robin arrives on the scene and coaxes Batman out of his hallucinogenic haze, spurring him to break free of his bonds. Batman and the Reaper fight, and Batman emerges victorious. As Batman holds the unmasked Chill over the acid pool, urged by Robin to drop him in, Chill's son Joey reveals himself and his father's identity. Deciding to act on the indecision that he faced when he had Joe Chill at his mercy years earlier, Bruce spares Chill's life. After the police arrive and Chill is taken away in an ambulance, Batman goes to a bridge and discards Joe Chill's firearm by throwing it into the ocean.

The New 52 
Introduced in The New 52, the Reaper is a criminal in Gotham City who was beaten and thrown into Blackgate Penitentiary.  When the Crime Syndicate arrived on Earth and killed the heroes, Bane opened up Blackgate so its prisoners would help him take back the city from the Arkham Asylum freaks who broke out earlier. 
Reaper participated in relatively minor battles until, in Union Circle, he gets into a major clash with the Asylum inmate the Firefly. The Reaper almost kills the Firefly, but the pyromaniac is saved by fellow lunatic the Sumo, who jumps onto the Reaper from a nearby building. The Reaper's bones are broken, according to the Sumo, by the big man's massive weight.

DC Rebirth 
In DC Rebirth, Judson Caspian spent his life as a crimefighter after the death of his wife and ruthlessly killed criminals. He was scorned by many people, including Thomas Wayne. For unknown reasons, he moved to Europe, where his son, Julian, would leave him, before moving back to Gotham City during Batman's earlier days where Judson once more assumed the identity of the Reaper. This led Batman to go to extreme measures to stop him, including using a gun; Batman ultimately defeated and unmasked him at a construction site and found out that he was his fiancé's father. Batman tried to save him, but Caspian chose to fall to his death rather than go to jail. 

After his funeral, Rachel left Bruce, and they never saw each other again. Meanwhile, his son Julian created the Reapers in order to continue his father's work around the world even creating an android version which fought Batman. In Gotham, an unrelated criminal took up the mantle of the Reaper, but used it to rob and kill innocent people.

Equipment
As the Reaper, Caspian wears a large hooded black cloak with heavily armored red leather or cuir bouilli, which prevents bullets and punches from affecting him in any way. The knees and elbows of the red leather armor are tipped with spikes that add more power to blows Caspian inflicts. Caspian also wears a skull-shaped mask with hooks on the mouth to cover up the lower part of the face and red glowing eyes. The Reaper also wields two scythe-shaped weapons, with various other lethal implements contained in the spiked shafts of both weapons. The haft contains a very powerful handgun and smoke pellets to help give to the illusion that the Reaper is in fact an incarnation of death. The scythes are stored in two inverted sheaths located on his back, under his cloak.

See also
 Andrea Beaumont

References

DC Comics male supervillains
Comics characters introduced in 1987
Characters created by Mike W. Barr
Characters created by Dennis O'Neil
Fictional American Jews in comics
Fictional German Jews
Fictional serial killers
Fictional socialites
Vigilante characters in comics